Ernest Clifford Penny (16 March 1912 – 10 January 2001) was an Australian rules footballer who played with St Kilda in the Victorian Football League (VFL).

Notes

External links 

1912 births
2001 deaths
Australian rules footballers from Melbourne
St Kilda Football Club players
People from Brighton, Victoria